Ilkin Hajiyev (born 8 January 1983), is an Azerbaijani futsal player who plays for Neftchi Baku and the Azerbaijan national futsal team.

References

External links
UEFA profile

1983 births
Living people
Azerbaijani men's futsal players